Montumana is a rural locality in the local government areas (LGA) of Circular Head and Waratah–Wynyard in the North-west and west LGA region of Tasmania. The 2016 census recorded a population of 67 for the state suburb of Montumana.

History 
Montumana was gazetted as a locality in 1966. Previously known as Detention River East and then as Ellison, the current name was approved in 1966.

Geography
The Detention River forms a small part of the northern boundary. Many of the boundaries are survey lines.

Road infrastructure 
Route A2 (Bass Highway) runs through from east to north.

See also
 Detention Falls

References

Towns in Tasmania
Localities of Circular Head Council
Localities of Waratah–Wynyard Council